The Lady Isobel Gathorne-Hardy Cup, often shortened to Isobel Cup, is the championship trophy awarded annually to the Premier Hockey Federation (PHF) playoff winner. It is named after Lady Isobel Gathorne-Hardy, one of the first known women to play the game and daughter of Lord Stanley (the namesake of the Stanley Cup, and former Governor-General of Canada).

The front of the trophy is engraved with "The Lady Isobel Gathorne-Hardy Cup 1875–1963. This Cup, shall be awarded annually to the greatest professional women's hockey team in North America. All who pursue this Cup, pursue a dream; a dream born with Isobel, that shall never die. EST. 2016."

The first Cup was awarded in 2016 at the end of the inaugural season of the NWHL, the first professional women's hockey league in the United States. The league is now known as the Premier Hockey Federation (PHF) and includes teams from both the United States and Canada who compete for the trophy.

Champions

See also

 List of sports awards honoring women

References

External links

 

Awards established in 2016
American ice hockey trophies and awards
Stanley family
2016 establishments in the United States
Sports trophies and awards
Sports awards honoring women
Premier Hockey Federation